The 2004 Aaron's 499 was the ninth stock car race of the 2004 NASCAR Nextel Cup Series season and the 35th iteration of the event. The race was held on Sunday, April 25, 2004, before a crowd of 155,000 in Lincoln, Alabama at Talladega Superspeedway, a 2.66 miles (4.28 km) permanent triangle-shaped superspeedway. The race took the scheduled 188 laps to complete. In a controversial end to the race, Jeff Gordon of Hendrick Motorsports would win the race under caution over fan favorite Dale Earnhardt Jr. of Dale Earnhardt, Inc., after Brian Vickers caused a caution with 5 to go.  The win was Gordon’s 65th career NASCAR Nextel Cup Series win and his first of the season. To fill out the podium, Kevin Harvick of Richard Childress Racing would finish third, after a review of the results of the last scoring loop.

The race is primarily remembered for its controversial finish. With 5 to go, Brian Vickers would spin in Turn 3, making NASCAR throw a caution. At the moment of caution, Jeff Gordon led fan favorite Dale Earnhardt Jr. in the middle of the turn. However, Dale Earnhardt Jr. would pass Gordon coming to the line. This led many to believe that Earnhardt Jr. had taken the lead, and since no green–white–checker rule had been instituted, Earnhardt Jr. had won, to the pleasure of fans. However, the season before, NASCAR had instituted a new rule that eliminated racing back to the line. In its place, now, the field would be frozen at the last scoring loop when the caution came out. As a result, Gordon, who led at the last scoring loop, took the win. This angered many in the audience, as they thought that Earnhardt Jr. had been robbed of a win. During Gordon's burnout, many pelted Gordon's car with beer cans and seat cushions, littering both Gordon's car and the racetrack. In a statement released by NASCAR spokesman Jim Hunter, he said that NASCAR did not throw a one lap shootout for safety reasons, stating "Here and at Daytona we're not going to have a one-lap shootout just because of safety. We're just not going to do that." Earnhardt Jr. had stated that NASCAR had made the right call, saying that "As much as it sucks not to win the race and get the trophy, I'm glad one of those calls finally went against me. It's going to shut a lot of people up." Gordon would take the beer can throwing in a light-hearted manner, saying in interviews years after that "[That was] the greatest day of my life… They were going crazy on my ass. Honestly, we had to have a lot of security.”

Background 

Talladega Superspeedway, originally known as Alabama International Motor Superspeedway (AIMS), is a motorsports complex located north of Talladega, Alabama. It is located on the former Anniston Air Force Base in the small city of Lincoln. The track is a tri-oval and was constructed in the 1960s by the International Speedway Corporation, a business controlled by the France family. Talladega is most known for its steep banking and the unique location of the start/finish line that's located just past the exit to pit road. The track currently hosts the NASCAR series such as the NASCAR Cup Series, Xfinity Series and the Gander RV & Outdoors Truck Series. Talladega is the longest NASCAR oval with a length of 2.66-mile-long (4.28 km) tri-oval like the Daytona International Speedway, which also is a 2.5-mile-long (4 km) tri-oval.

Entry list 

*Withdrew.

Practice

First practice 
The first practice session would take place on Friday, April 23, at 12:00 PM EST, and would last for one hour and 30 minutes.

Second practice 
The second practice session would occur on Saturday, April 24, at 10:30 AM EST, and would last for 45 minutes.

Third and final practice 
The third and final practice session, sometimes referred to as Happy Hour, would occur on Saturday, April 24, at 12:10 AM EST, and would last for 45 minutes.

Qualifying 
Qualifying would take place on Friday, April 23, at 4:10 PM EST. Each driver would have two laps to set a fastest time; the fastest of the two would count as their official qualifying lap. Positions 1-38 would be decided on time, while positions 39-43 would be based on provisionals. Four spots are awarded by the use of provisionals based on owner's points. The fifth is awarded to a past champion who has not otherwise qualified for the race. If no past champ needs the provisional, the next team in the owner points will be awarded a provisional.

Three drivers would fail to qualify: Larry Foyt, Todd Bodine, and Kirk Shelmerdine.

Full qualifying results

Race results

References 

2004 NASCAR Nextel Cup Series
NASCAR races at Talladega Superspeedway
April 2004 sports events in the United States
2004 in sports in Alabama
NASCAR controversies